State Route 178 (SR 178) is a 11.5 mile long north-south state highway in Tipton County, Tennessee. It connects the towns of Munford and Gilt Edge.

Route description

SR 178 begins in Munford at an intersection with US 51/SR 3 and heads north through neighborhoods and subdivisions as Tipton Road. It then enters downtown along Tipton Street S, where it passes businesses before having an intersection with SR 206 (Munford Avenue). The highway then makes a left onto Main Street before turning right onto Munford Giltedge Road. SR 178 continues northeast to pass through neighborhoods before leaving Munford and winding its way northward through rural areas. It then enters Gilt Edge and comes to an end at a y-intersection with SR 59.  The entire route of SR 178 is a two-lane highway.

Major intersections

References

178
Transportation in Tipton County, Tennessee